Berinthia "Berry" Berenson-Perkins ( Berenson; April 14, 1948 – September 11, 2001) was an American actress, model and photographer. She was the widow of actor Anthony Perkins. She died in the September 11 attacks as a passenger on American Airlines Flight 11.

Early life
Berry Berenson was born in Murray Hill, Manhattan, New York City. Her mother was born Maria-Luisa Yvonne Radha de Wendt de Kerlor, better known as Gogo Schiaparelli, a socialite of Italian, Swiss, French, and Egyptian ancestry. Her father, Robert Lawrence Berenson, was an American career diplomat turned shipping executive; he was of Lithuanian-Jewish descent, and his family's original surname was "Valvrojenski".

Berenson's maternal grandmother was the Italian-born fashion designer Elsa Schiaparelli, and her maternal grandfather was Wilhelm de Wendt de Kerlor, a Theosophist and psychic medium. Her elder sister, Marisa Berenson, became a well-known model and actress. She also was a great-grandniece of Giovanni Schiaparelli, an Italian astronomer who believed he had discovered the supposed canals of Mars, and a second cousin, once removed, of art expert Bernard Berenson (1865–1959) and his sister Senda Berenson (1868–1954), an athlete and educator who was one of the first two women elected to the Basketball Hall of Fame.

Career
Following a brief modeling career in the late 1960s, Berenson became a freelance photographer. By 1973, her photographs had been published in Life, Glamour, Vogue and Newsweek.

Berenson studied acting at New York's The American Place Theatre with Wynn Handman along with Richard Gere, Philip Anglim, Penelope Milford, Robert Ozn, Ingrid Boulting and her sister Marisa.

Berenson also appeared in several motion pictures. She starred opposite Anthony Perkins in the 1978 Alan Rudolph film Remember My Name, and appeared with Jeff Bridges in the 1979 film Winter Kills and Malcolm McDowell in Cat People (1982).

Personal life and death

On August 9, 1973, in Cape Cod, Massachusetts, Berenson, three months pregnant, married her future Remember My Name co-star Anthony Perkins. The couple raised two sons: actor-director Oz Perkins and folk/rock singer-songwriter Elvis Perkins. They remained married until the death of Perkins from AIDS-related complications on September 12, 1992.

Berenson died on September 11, 2001 as she was returning home to Los Angeles following a holiday on Cape Cod. She and the rest of the passengers and crew aboard American Airlines Flight 11 died when it was hijacked and crashed into the World Trade Center during the September 11 attacks in Manhattan.

At the National September 11 Memorial & Museum, Berenson is memorialized at the North Pool, on Panel N-76.

References

External links

 
 
 Several news stories about Berry Berenson

2001 deaths
Actresses from New York City
American Airlines Flight 11 victims
American film actresses
American people of Egyptian descent
American people of French descent
American people of Italian descent
American people of Lithuanian-Jewish descent
American people of Swiss descent
American terrorism victims
American women photographers
Female models from New York (state)
Jewish American actresses
Models from New York City
People from Murray Hill, Manhattan
People from Wellfleet, Massachusetts
20th-century American actresses
21st-century American actresses